Parkovy (masculine), Parkovaya (feminine), or Parkovoye (neuter) may refer to:
Parkovy (rural locality) (Parkovaya, Parkovoye), name of several rural localities in Russia
Parkovy Microdistrict, a microdistrict of Perm, Russia